Kenan Arayıcı (born 5 January 1972) is a retired Turkish football defender.

References

1972 births
Living people
Turkish footballers
Füchse Berlin Reinickendorf players
İstanbulspor footballers
Altay S.K. footballers
Göztepe S.K. footballers
Manisaspor footballers
İzmirspor footballers
MKE Kırıkkalespor footballers
Berliner AK 07 players
Berliner FC Dynamo players
Association football defenders
Süper Lig players
Turkish expatriate footballers
Expatriate footballers in Germany
Turkish expatriate sportspeople in Germany
Turkish football managers
Expatriate football managers in Germany
People from Hınıs